Epitoxis amazoula is a moth of the subfamily Arctiinae. It was described by Jean Baptiste Boisduval in 1847. It is found in South Africa.

References

 

Endemic moths of South Africa
Arctiinae
Moths described in 1847